Indian Railway Finance Corporation (IRFC) is an Indian public sector undertaking engaged in raising financial resources for expansion and running through capital markets and other borrowings. The Government of India owns a majority stake in the company, while the Ministry of Railways has the administrative control.

History
IRFC was founded by A.Kishore  . It started borrowing from the market in 1987–88.

The company
IRFC raises money through financial bonds and from banks and financial institutions. In 2019 Amitabh Banerjee was appointed as the Managing Director of the company.

The company announced its initial public offering on 18 January 2021 and got listed on the National Stock Exchange of India / Bombay Stock Exchange on 29 January 2021.

Board of Directors
Current Board of Directors of Indian Railway Finance Corporation includes Amitabh Banerjee as Chairman and Managing Director, Shelly Verma as Director (Finance) & Chief Financial Officer, Baldeo Purushartha as Nominee Director, Bhaskar Choradia as Nominee Director, Vallabhbhai Maneklal Patel as Non-Official Independent Director, and Sheela Pandit as Non-Official Independent Director.

See also 
 Rail Vikas Nigam, involved in building rail infrastructure required by the Indian railways.

References

External links
 Official site

Railway companies of India
Financial services companies based in Delhi
Government finances in India
Indian companies established in 1986
1986 establishments in Delhi
Companies listed on the National Stock Exchange of India
Companies listed on the Bombay Stock Exchange